Lindsay Davenport and Mary Joe Fernández were the defending champions, but played this year with different partners. Davenport teamed up with Jana Novotná and lost in third round to Conchita Martínez and Patricia Tarabini, while Fernández teamed up with Lisa Raymond, losing in the final.

Gigi Fernández and Natasha Zvereva won the title, defeating Fernández and Raymond 6–2, 6–3 in the final. It was the 6th Fren Open title, 16th Grand Slam title and 68th overall doubles title for Fernández, and the 6th French Open title, 17th Grand Slam title and 66th overall doubles title for Zvereva, in their respective careers.

Seeds

Draw

Finals

Top half

Section 1

Section 2

Bottom half

Section 3

Section 4

External links
 Official Results Archive (WTA)
1997 French Open – Women's draws and results at the International Tennis Federation

Women's Doubles
French Open by year – Women's doubles
French Open - Women's Doubles
1997 in French women's sport